Louis William Schmidt (29 December 1887 – 23 October 1975) was an Australian rules footballer who played for the Richmond Football Club in the Victorian Football Association (VFA) in 1907 then in the Victorian Football League (VFL) from 1908 to 1911 and again in 1921. He played for the St Kilda Football Club between 1912 and 1914 and again from 1918 until 1920.

In 1913, Schmidt kicked a goal after the siren to destroy Carlton's chances of making the finals; it is the first recorded instance of a VFL player kicking a goal after the siren to win the match. Schmidt, who was known for his accurate kicking using the drop kick or the place kick, steered the ball through the goals from 45 yards.

Schmidt was later reprimanded for swearing at a stewart after the tribunal. Schmidt opted not to play that year and the following two years St Kilda were in recess because of the war. In 1918 St Kilda recommenced and so did Billy.

 
Schmidt became closely aligned with Warracknabeal. He was first lured to the town mid-season in 1919 with an offer to coach for the rest of the year. He was still coaching Warracknabeal during the week when he returned to play for St. Kilda in the 1920 season. He again crossed back to Richmond in 1921 but he realised he was getting too old for the VFL standard required and he returned to Warracknabeal. Cleared from Richmond he help Warracknabeal to the premiership. Locals considered him responsible for raising the level of play across the Wimmera. He led the town to three premierships between 1921 and 1930. In 1932 he took up an offer to coach North Gambier after they had a poor start to the season. He got the team to lift to finish third for the year. 

He then coached Richmond for one season, 1933, where they lost the Grand Final to South Melbourne. The following year Richmond appointed their club captain, Percy Bentley as playing coach to ward off outside clubs offers.

Schmidt returned to the Wimmera where he had set up a business. He coached Minyip in 1934, and they won the Mid Wimmera FL premiership. The Wimmera FL had split in 1932 and the larger clubs were playing in a Ballarat base competition.
In 1939, he was re-appointed coach of Minyip Football Club.

Notes

References 
 Hogan P: The Tigers Of Old, Richmond FC, (Melbourne), 1996.

External links

1887 births
1975 deaths
Australian rules footballers from Melbourne
Australian Rules footballers: place kick exponents
Warracknabeal Football Club players
Richmond Football Club players
St Kilda Football Club players
Richmond Football Club coaches
Richmond Football Club (VFA) players
People from Richmond, Victoria